Kostis Gimossoulis (born 1960) is a Greek poet and novelist. He read Law at the University of Athens. He is also a draughtsman and watercolorist, and Μαύρος Χρυσός (Golden Black), a book he published in 2001, contains poems, stories and watercolors he produced.

Selected works

Poetry
Ο ξυλοκόπος πυρετός (The fever of the thief),1983
Η Αγία Μελάνη (Fully ink), 1983
Το στόμα κλέφτης (The thief mouth), 1986
Επικίνδυνα παιδιά (Dangerous boys), 1992
Αγάπη από ζήλια (Jealously returning to Love), anthology, 2004

Prose
Μια νύχτα με την κόκκινη (One night with red woman), 1995
Ανατολή (Anatoli), 1998
Βρέχει φως (Rained Light), 2002

References

External links
Reading a poem at the 18th International Festival of Poetry at Medellin, Colombia and his entry at the Festival website
His page at the website of the Hellenic Authors' Society (Greek)
His books at Kedros publishers

1960 births
Living people
Writers from Athens
National and Kapodistrian University of Athens alumni
21st-century Greek poets
Greek novelists
20th-century Greek poets
Greek male poets
20th-century Greek male writers
21st-century Greek male writers